Aude Vermoezen (born 25 July 1989) is a Belgian former professional tennis player.

Biography
An ambidextrous player from Grimbergen, Vermoezen could use both double-handed forehands and backhands. In 2005 she won a bronze medal in the girls' singles event at the  European Youth Summer Olympic Festival and featured in the junior draws at Wimbledon. From 2006 she competed as a professional.

In 2007, Vermoezen was called up to Belgium's Fed Cup team for a World Group playoff tie against China in Knokke-Heist. She was an injury replacement for Kirsten Flipkens, in a Belgian side already missing their top players. Her opportunity came in the doubles, a dead rubber, which she and Debbrich Feys lost to the Chinese pairing, whose team won the tie 4-1.

Vermoezen retired due to injury in 2008.

ITF finals

Doubles (0–2)

References

External links
 
 
 

1989 births
Living people
Belgian female tennis players
People from Grimbergen
Sportspeople from Flemish Brabant
21st-century Belgian women